Nakina/Lower Twin Lake Water Aerodrome  was located  southeast of Nakina, Ontario, Canada. The airport was listed as abandoned in the 15 March 2007 Canada Flight Supplement.

See also
 Nakina Airport
 Nakina Water Aerodrome

References

Defunct seaplane bases in Ontario
Transport in Thunder Bay District